Franz Aschenbrenner (born 24 May 1986) is a German motorcycle racer.

Career statistics

Grand Prix motorcycle racing

By season

Races by year
(key)

References

External links
 Profile on MotoGP.com

Living people
1986 births
German motorcycle racers
250cc World Championship riders